The Office of the Special Envoy on Holocaust Issues is an office in the United States State Department dedicated to returning to Holocaust-era victims their lost property, and monitoring anti-Semitism going forward. The office includes a Special Envoy for Holocaust Issues and a Special Adviser for Holocaust Issues.

The current Special Envoy for Holocaust Issues is Ellen Germain, who was appointed on August 23, 2021 substituting Cherrie Daniels, who served as the special envoy from August 19, 2019 until August 6, 2021.

References

United States Department of State agencies